This is a list of notable events in country music that took place in the year 1987.

Events
 June 13 — Randy Travis' "Forever and Ever, Amen" spends three weeks at No. 1 of the Billboard Hot Country Singles chart. It is the first multi-week chart-topping song since "Lost in the Fifties Tonight (In the Still of the Night)" by Ronnie Milsap spent two weeks atop the chart in September 1985; in that time span, 85 songs would rotate in and out of the chart's top spot. Incidentally, only three other songs during the entire 1980s decade — all of them in 1980 — would spend more than two weeks at No. 1, owing much to how Billboard compiled the chart data at the time.
 September — Dolly Parton's much anticipated TV variety series, Dolly, premieres on ABC in September. Despite a promising start (due to strong ratings in its early weeks), the show was panned by critics and its audience began to lose interest. After a continual decline on viewership, the series was cancelled at the end of the 1987–1988 season.

No dates
 46-year-old singer-songwriter K.T. Oslin becomes the success story of the year with her hit "80s Ladies," a Grammy Award-winner which told the story of three friends from childhood who stayed together through an era of social change. The song spawned an award-winning video as well and despite only reaching No. 7 on the Billboard Hot Country Singles chart, was one of the most played songs of the year. Oslin's rise to fame in her mid-40s came at a time when mainstream country radio was beginning to shun older female artists in lieu of younger, more attractive stars.

Top hits of the year

Singles released by American artists

Singles released by Canadian artists

Top new album releases

Other top albums

On television

Regular series
 Dolly (1987–1988, ABC)
 Hee Haw (1969–1993, syndicated)

Specials

Births
January 31 – Tyler Hubbard, member of Florida Georgia Line, a duo of the 2010s.
May 7 – Russell Dickerson, country performer of the 2010s onward.
May 21 – Cody Johnson, Texas country singer-songwriter of the 2010s onward ("'Til You Can't").
August 16 – Dan Smyers, member of Dan + Shay, a rising duo of the 2010s.
September 25 — Greg Bates, up-and-coming country singer of the early 2010s.
October 17 – Jameson Rodgers, up-and-coming country singer-songwriter of the early 2020s.

Deaths
 June 25 – Boudleaux Bryant, 67, songwriter (with wife Felice) of many 1950s and 1960s hits.

Hall of Fame inductees

Country Music Hall of Fame inductees
Rod Brasfield (1910–1958)

Canadian Country Music Hall of Fame inductees
Lucille Starr

Major awards

Grammy Awards
Best Female Country Vocal Performance — "80's Ladies", K. T. Oslin
Best Male Country Vocal Performance — Always & Forever, Randy Travis
Best Country Performance by a Duo or Group with Vocal — Trio, Dolly Parton, Linda Ronstadt and Emmylou Harris
Best Country Collaboration with Vocals — "Make No Mistake, She's Mine," Ronnie Milsap and Kenny Rogers
Best Country Instrumental Performance — "String of Pars," Asleep at the Wheel
Best Country Song — "Forever and Ever, Amen," Paul Overstreet and Don Schlitz (Performer: Randy Travis)

Juno Awards
Country Male Vocalist of the Year — Ian Tyson
Country Female Vocalist of the Year — k.d. lang
Country Group or Duo of the Year — Prairie Oyster

Academy of Country Music
Entertainer of the Year — Hank Williams, Jr.
Song of the Year — "Forever and Ever, Amen," Paul Overstreet and Don Schlitz (Performer: Randy Travis)
Single of the Year — "Forever and Ever, Amen," Randy Travis
Album of the Year — Trio, Emmylou Harris, Dolly Parton, and Linda Ronstadt
Top Male Vocalist — Randy Travis
Top Female Vocalist — Reba McEntire
Top Vocal Duo — The Judds
Top Vocal Group — Highway 101
Top New Male Vocalist — Ricky Van Shelton
Top New Female Vocalist — K. T. Oslin
Video of the Year — "80's Ladies", K. T. Oslin (Director: Jack Cole)

ARIA Awards 
(presented in Sydney on March 2, 1987)
Best Country Album - Mallee Boy (John Williamson)

Canadian Country Music Association
Entertainer of the Year — k.d. lang
Male Artist of the Year — Ian Tyson
Female Artist of the Year — Anita Perras
Group of the Year — Family Brown
SOCAN Song of the Year — "Heroes" Gary Fjellgaard (Performer: Mercey Brothers)
Single of the Year — "Navajo Rug", Ian Tyson
Album of the Year — Cowboyography, Ian Tyson
Top Selling Album — Storms of Life, Randy Travis
Vista Rising Star Award — k.d. lang
Duo of the Year — Anita Perras and Tim Taylor

Country Music Association
Entertainer of the Year — Hank Williams, Jr.
Song of the Year — "Forever and Ever, Amen," Paul Overstreet and Don Schlitz (Performer: Randy Travis)
Single of the Year — "Forever and Ever, Amen," Randy Travis
Album of the Year — Always & Forever, Randy Travis
Male Vocalist of the Year — Randy Travis
Female Vocalist of the Year — Reba McEntire
Vocal Duo of the Year — Ricky Skaggs and Sharon White
Vocal Group of the Year — The Judds
Horizon Award — Holly Dunn
Music Video of the Year — "My Name Is Bocephus," Hank Williams, Jr. (Directors: Bill Fishman and Preacher Ewing)
Instrumentalist of the Year — Johnny Gimble

Further reading
Kingsbury, Paul, "The Grand Ole Opry: History of Country Music. 70 Years of the Songs, the Stars and the Stories," Villard Books, Random House; Opryland USA, 1995
Kingsbury, Paul, "Vinyl Hayride: Country Music Album Covers 1947–1989," Country Music Foundation, 2003
Millard, Bob, "Country Music: 70 Years of America's Favorite Music," HarperCollins, New York, 1993
Whitburn, Joel, "Top Country Songs 1944–2005 – 6th Edition." 2005.

Other links
Country Music Association
Inductees of the Country Music Hall of Fame

External links
Country Music Hall of Fame

Country
Country music by year